In 1824, in appreciation of the enormous service rendered to this country by the Marquis de Lafayette during the Revolutionary War, Congress voted to grant him a full township in the Florida Territory. This tract was called the Lafayette Land Grant and encompassed over 23,000 acres. While the Marquis never came to visit his property, he designated an agent to sell parcels of it on his behalf. The 2,400 acres upon which Goodwood Plantation was sited was purchased by Hardy Croom from the Lafayette Grant in 1834.

Goodwood Plantation (also known as Old Croom Mansion) was a medium-sized cotton plantation of about 1,675 acres (7 km2) in central Leon County, Florida, established by Hardy Bryan Croom. It is located at 1600 Miccosukee Road. The plantation was added to the U.S. National Register of Historic Places on June 30, 1972.

Goodwood Museum & Gardens
The plantation home is now a historic house museum known as Goodwood Museum & Gardens that features original family furniture, porcelain, textiles, glassware, art and personal effects.  The rooms have been decorated to appear in the years surrounding World War I.  The house is visited by guided tour, for which there is a fee.

The grounds cover , and the gardens also feature an early 20th-century design.  Admission to the gardens is free.

Plantation specifics
The 1850 U.S. Federal Census Slave Schedule listed Bryan Croom as owning 129 enslaved people. However, at that time he also controlled some 40 enslaved people who were owned by his mother-in-law, Ann Hawks, who lived with Bryan Croom.

The Leon County Florida 1860 Agricultural Census shows that Goodwood Plantation, when owned by Arvah Hopkins,  had the following:
 Improved Land: 1050 acres (4 km2)
 Unimproved Land: 625 acres (2½ km2)
 Cash value of plantation: $33,640
 Cash value of farm implements/machinery: $600
 Cash value of farm animals: $3000
 Number of slaves: unknown **
 Bushels of corn: 2500
 Bales of cotton: 150

It is not known why the number of enslaved people was not listed in 1860, but in 1858, Arvah Hopkins bought 41 slaves, together with his purchase of the real estate.

For a short period of time, at Goodwood's greatest extent, in the 1850s when owned by Bryan Hardy Croom, it constituted some 8,000 non-contiguous acres.

The owners
The Croom family of Lenoir County, North Carolina, wealthy tobacco planters, began purchasing land in North Florida in the 1820s, including plantations in Mariana, Quincy and Tallahassee. Hardy Bryan Croom, a planter and amateur naturalist, brought attention to the now rare stinking cedar. His younger brother, Bryan Hardy Croom, made similar purchases. Bryan first began living at Rocky Comfort Plantation in Gadsden County, on land the men's father, William, had purchased. Bryan was married to Eveline Hawks, and the couple had no children. The brothers had some 60 enslaved people from their North Carolina plantations transported down to Florida, and throughout the Croom years, purchased many more slaves to operate their cotton, corn and other row crop plantations.

But Hardy's time in Florida was to be short. On Saturday, October 7, 1837, Hardy B. Croom and his wife, three children—two daughters and a son—accompanied by a maternal aunt, boarded the steam packet liner S.S. Home in New York City bound for Charleston.  Hardy's plan was for his family to live in Charleston for a time, then eventually move to Tallahassee. The Home sank off the coast of North Carolina during the 1837 Racer's Storm, a hurricane. Approximately 90 people drowned, and approximately 30 people survived. Hardy and his family all perished in the wreck. No will was found, so his brother, Bryan Croom, assumed he had inherited his brother's Florida plantation property, and proceeded accordingly.

A small home was framed in on the Goodwood site at Hardy's death, and Bryan's enslaved workers completed it. But Bryan Croom ordered construction of a long planned main house some years thereafter, an  approximately 10,000 square foot mansion. The house, which design may have been that chosen by the doomed Hardy, was built mainly by enslaved laborers also. Richard Shine, a prominent Tallahassee builder and businessman, oversaw the construction. According to Shine, the house was completed around 1850. Due to the logistics of building a large home, and due a series of adverse events, such as a financial depression, yellow fever epidemics and a banking crisis, it likely took years to complete. The house was Italianate in style, a dark rose color with ornate burgundy colored railings. While the reason the plantation was named Goodwood is unclear, in family letters, it became known by that name in the 1840s. Contemporaneous newspaper articles exist referring to Goodwood in the 1850s.

After the Home tragedy, relatives of Hardy's wife Frances, primarily her mother, Henrietta Smith, fought what became a landmark court case. The court case dragged on for some 20 years. Who would inherit when an entire family perished in a common disaster without a will? Mrs. Smith did not initially sue, but first asked her son-in-law's brother, Bryan Croom, for a part of the estate, in light of the loss of her daughter, grandchildren and her sister.  Bryan, however, declined to cede Mrs. Smith anything. Bryan Croom won in lower court proceedings. But the Florida Supreme Court  ultimately awarded the Smith family much of the estate in 1857.  The issues were two; was Hardy domiciled in North Carolina at the time of his death, or was he domiciled in Florida, where his large plantation interests were?  The laws of the two states were different. The second issue was, who died last in the wreck of the steamship Home, someone in the maternal line or Hardy himself? The Florida Supreme Court decided Hardy was still domiciled In North Carolina at the time of his death. The Court also decided he had not intended to establish domicile in Florida when he boarded the Home, but had instead, based on his last letters, determined to relocate his family to Charleston, South Carolina, where he had rented a house. But Hardy and his family drowned before reaching another state. Testimony from witnesses who survived the Home tragedy testified that Hardy's son (hence representative of the maternal line) was the last surviving member of the family. Witnesses saw his son clinging to a spar in the ocean, after all the other Crooms had perished.

Bryan Croom moved to Alabama. Mrs. Smith did not come to Goodwood to live, but in 1858, sold the estate to Arvah Hopkins. Hopkins, a New Yorker, was a prominent local merchant who had married the educated and well-to-do Susan Branch, the youngest daughter of former North Carolina Governor John Branch. He purchased 1,576 acres of land, and part of the transaction included the purchase of 41 enslaved people. Hopkins operated a large store downtown, and also made money as a factor. The couple had nine children, of whom eight survived to adulthood. The Hopkinses continued formal smaller scale plantation operations until 1865. The Hopkins smaller farming operations continued after the war, with share cropping and tenant farming done mostly by formerly enslaved people.

In 1885 an Englishman, Dr. William Lamb Arrowsmith, claiming to have been surgeon-general to the Italian Giuseppe Garibaldi, as well as holding other offices in Europe, purchased Goodwood and  surrounding it. He brought with him some of the paintings and furnishings still in the house. Arrowsmith died about eight months later, leaving his wife and her companion, Martha Dykes, to live on the estate for more than twenty-five years. Mrs. Arrowsmith died at 80 and is buried in Tallahassee, leaving what was left of her personal estate to Miss Dykes.

Before her death, Mrs. Arrowsmith sold Goodwood to an extremely wealthy  widow, Mrs. Alexander (Frances) Tiers. The year was 1911.  Fanny Lathrop Hopkins Tiers (1860-1928), whose principal estate, Farmlands, was in Morris County, New Jersey, was related by marriage to the Fleischmann family, owners of Waverly Plantation, which was adjacent to Goodwood. Although she spent only the winter months at Goodwood, Mrs. Tiers instituted an expansive renovation of the estate and  remodeled the house to a Mount Vernon style and replaced the wrought iron with Georgian columns. She remodeled three other antebellum structures; the original kitchen, the original small house and a building whose original use remains uncertain. It may have been a storehouse or commissary, a place where bricks were made or other plantation industries occurred. These buildings still stand.  Mrs. Tiers added a water tower, where previously wells, cisterns and pumps supplied the plantation. She built an amusement hall, guest cottages, servant quarters, a heated swimming pool, tennis courts and a carriage house. Mrs. Tiers entertained lavishly, and many of her wealthy friends came from the North to enjoy North Florida's warm winters.

Mrs. Tiers moved to Paris in 1925, selling Goodwood to Florida State Senator William C. Hodges. Attorney Hodges hailed from Indiana, was well travelled, well educated and quite the ladies man. Senator Hodges married his wife Margaret Wilson when she was 18 and he was 41 years of age. The couple had no children. They did entertain lavishly at Goodwood, not only politicians but an eclectic group of visitors, including artists, writers and numerous public figures. They kept  macaws, peacocks, parrots, and ornamental fowl. They also owned small monkeys, some known for escaping into the neighborhood.

Senator Hodges, a lifelong cigar smoker, died of a heart condition at Goodwood in 1940. Mrs. Hodges, at friends' urging, ran for her husband's unexpired Senate term. She initially announced she would do so, providing she could run unopposed. Others did oppose her however, and she lost. Mrs. Hodges rented the guest cottages for income after her husband died.

In 1948, Margaret Hodges remarried. Her second husband was Thomas Milton Hood, a West Virginia native and Army Air Corps major she had met through the rental of one of her guest cottages. Margaret was more than ten years her new husband's senior. The Tallahassee Democrat, in a March 3, 1948, article reported that the two had filed for a marriage license. The prospective groom was described as a "Washington DC designer and an engineer."

After his wife's death in 1978, Major Hood rented out the guest cottages to a colorful group of people, creating an artist's colony atmosphere. He also began planning for the restoration of Goodwood as a house museum and public park. He established the Margaret E. Wilson Foundation in her memory. He died in 1990, after years of poor health. Tom Hood also left the Atkinson Children's Trust for Margaret's great nephews and nieces, Christine Wilson Atkinson, Diane Margaret Atkinson, Thomas Patrick Atkinson, David Lane Atkinson and William Hodges Atkinson. They are Patricia Wilson Atkinson's five Children. The survival of Goodwood is due in large part to Major Hood's efforts, for he resisted calls to sell or donate Goodwood to the state, to sell it otherwise, or allow it to be torn down for development. After his death, the Margaret E. Wilson Foundation and its operating agent Goodwood Museum and Gardens, Inc. assumed stewardship for Goodwood.

See also
 Plantations of Leon County

References

Book: The Croom Family and Goodwood Plantation, Land, Litigation and Southern Lives, William Rogers and Erica R. Clark, published 2010, 320 pages, University Of Georgia Press

Book: The Seasons Of Goodwood, the unfolding story of a treasured Southern Mansion as Home, Wallace Harper Beall, published 2017

Goodwood Newsletters, numerous editions from 1990 to 2018

External links

Leon County listings at National Register of Historic Places
Leon County listings at Florida's Office of Cultural and Historical Programs
Goodwood Plantation History

Culture of Tallahassee, Florida
Farm museums in Florida
Historic house museums in Florida
Houses on the National Register of Historic Places in Florida
Museums in Tallahassee, Florida
National Register of Historic Places in Tallahassee, Florida
Plantations in Leon County, Florida
Historic American Buildings Survey in Florida
Cotton plantations in Florida
Houses in Leon County, Florida
1833 establishments in Florida Territory